Topp is an English and German surname. Notable people with the surname include:

Alexander Topp (1814–1879), Scottish minister 
Arthur Topp (1844–1916), English-Australian journalist
Bob Topp (1932–2017), American football player
Brian Topp (born 1960), Canadian politician and writer
Erich Topp (1914–2005), German admiral
Gerhard Topp (1893–1968), Danish athlete
Kalman Topp (born 1972), American rabbi and author
Karl Topp (1895–1981), German naval officer
Laurie Topp (1923–2017), English footballer
Samuel Topp (1850–1902), English-Australian lawyer
Shayne Topp (born 1991), American actor and comedian
Willy Topp (born 1986), Chilean footballer

English-language surnames
German-language surnames